is a Japanese former professional footballer who played as a midfielder or forward. He played for the Japan national team.

Club career
Okano was born in Yokohama on 25 July 1972. After dropped out from Nihon University, he joined Urawa Reds in 1994. In 1990s, he played as forward in many matches from first season. In 2001 season, his opportunity to play decreased and he moved to Vissel Kobe in September. He played as midfielder from then. He returned to Urawa Reds in 2004. The club won the champions 2006 J1 League, 2005 and 2006 Emperor's Cup. In Asia, the club won 2007 AFC Champions League. In 2009, he moved to Hong Kong First Division League club TSW Pegasus. In July 2009, he returned to Japan and joined Japan Football League club Gainare Tottori. The club won the champions in 2010 and was promoted to J2 League. He retired end of 2013 season.

International career
In January 1995, he was selected by the Japan national team for the 1995 King Fahd Cup, but he did not play. On 20 September 1995, he debuted for the Japan national team against Paraguay. In 1996, he played at the 1996 Asian Cup. During 1998 World Cup qualification, in the final qualifier match for the 1998 World Cup against Iran, he scored the golden goal that took Japan to their first ever World Cup finals. At the 1998 World Cup, he played 29 minutes as a substitute against Croatia. He also played at the 1999 Copa America. This competition was his last game for Japan. He played 25 games and scored 2 goals for Japan until 1999.

Career statistics

Club

International

Scores and results list Japan's goal tally first, score column indicates score after each Okano goal.

Honours
Urawa Red Diamonds
 AFC Champions League: 2007
 J1 League: 2006
 Emperor's Cup: 2005, 2006
 Japanese Super Cup: 2006

Gainare Tottori
 Japan Football League: 2010

Individual
 J.League Best XI: 1996
 J.League Fair Play Award: 1996

Professional wrestling championships
 DDT Pro-Wrestling: Ironman Heavymetalweight Championship (1 time)

Notes

References

External links
 
 
 Japan National Football Team Database
 
 Masayuki Okano Blog (Japanese)

1972 births
Living people
Nihon University alumni
Association football people from Kanagawa Prefecture
Japanese footballers
Japan international footballers
Japanese expatriate footballers
J1 League players
J2 League players
Japan Football League players
Urawa Red Diamonds players
Vissel Kobe players
TSW Pegasus FC players
Gainare Tottori players
1995 King Fahd Cup players
1996 AFC Asian Cup players
1998 FIFA World Cup players
1999 Copa América players
Hong Kong First Division League players
Japanese expatriate sportspeople in Hong Kong
Expatriate footballers in Hong Kong
Association football midfielders
Ironman Heavymetalweight Champions